Hypselartemon is a genus of air-breathing land snails, terrestrial pulmonate gastropod mollusks in the family Streptaxidae.

Distribution 
The distribution of the genus Hypselartemon includes Brazil and Colombia.

Species
Species within the genus Hypselartemon include:
 Hypselartemon alveus (Dunker, 1845)
 Hypselartemon contusulus (Férussac, 1827)
 Hypselartemon deshayesianus (Crosse, 1863)
 Hypselartemon paivanus (Pfeiffer, 1867)

References

 Bank, R. A. (2017). Classification of the Recent terrestrial Gastropoda of the World. Last update: July 16th, 2017.

External links
 Breure, A. S. H. & Araujo, R. (2017). The Neotropical land snails (Mollusca, Gastropoda) collected by the “Comisión Científica del Pacífico.”. PeerJ. 5, e3065

Streptaxidae